Pandurang Gamaji Abhang is the President of ‘Deenmitrakar’ Mukundrao Patil Smarak Samiti.

Abhang is a veteran leader in the co-operative sector in Ahmednagar district. He was the Member of Maharashtra Legislative Assembly from 1995 to 1999.
Hailing from an agricultural background, he was inspired by  Yashwantrao Chavan and Marutrao Ghule Patil. Beginning his career at a grassroots level, in the political and co-operative sector, he was elevated to the post of Chairman of Ahmednagar District Central Co-operative Bank (the largest co-operative bank in Asia).  He is also the Vice-Chairman of Shri. Dnyaneshwar Co-operative Sugar Factory Ltd. and has been associated with the day-to-day functioning since its inception; working for the well-being and prosperity of ordinary farmers and rural people. Nominated to various social and political organizations, he has used them to serve the public at- large. 
He has also served on the Board of Trustees for Shri. Saibaba Sansthan Shirdi and is an active trustee on Sant Dnyaneshwar Trust Newasa. In addition, he is the founder and chief mentor of Samata Rural Multi-state Co-operative credit Society, which meets the financial and banking needs of the underprivileged and common people. He has incepted various co-operative institutions, cotton ginning factory, primary agricultural societies, Ahmednagar District Labour Federation etc. He is serving in the management of various schools, high schools, colleges; shaping the future generations of the country.

Timeline

1967-71: Sarpanch, Kukana Grampanchayat
1971-74: Vice Chairman, Kukana Agricultural Society
1973-77: Director, Newasa Agricultural Produce Market Committee
1974-78: Newasa Taluka Kharedi-Vikri Sangh
1977- Foundation of Dnyaneshwar Co-op Sugar Factory
1977-85, 1994–95, 2004-till date: Vice President, Dnyaneshwar Co-op Sugar Factory
1979-90: Member of Ahmednagar Zilla Parishad
1980-90: Director, Ahmednagar Dist. Labour Federation
1982-85: President, Ahmednagar Dist.  Labour Federation
1985-90, 2008-till date: Director, Ahmednagar Dist. Central Co-op Bank.
1985: Dnyaneshwar Oil Mill
1995-1999: Member of Maharashtra Legislative Assembly
1995-till date: President, Deenmitrakar Mukundrao Patil Trust
1997-till date: Vice President, Samata Parishad
1997-till date: Trustee, Dnyaneshwar Temple Trust
1998-till date: Vice President, Charkradhar Swami Trust
1998: Foundation of Samata Rural Co-op Credit Soc.Ltd
1998: Advisory Member, Mahatma Phule Agricultural University
1999: Establishment of Dnyaneshwar Ginning & Pressing Factory
2004-2014: Observer, Pune District Nationalist Congress Party
2004-10: Trustee, Saibaba Sansthan Trust, Shirdi
2010-13: President, Ahmednagar Dist. Central Co-op Bank
2014-till date: President, Ahmednagr Dist. Nationalist Congress Party
secretary :Late Marutrao Ghule Patil Charitable Trust
Vice President: Late Marutrao Ghule Patil Education Soc.
Member: Maharshtra State Rural Employment Board

Awards and recognition
 Dr. Patangrao Kadam Foundation`s Lifetime Achievement Award
 Late Sahakarmahrshi Bhausaheb Thorat Award for Excellence in Co-operative Sector
 Press Reporters and Editors Association Maharashtra- Lifetime  Achievement, Award
Under his leadership:
 NABARD`s Kisan Club Award to ADCC Bank, Ahmednagar,
 Economical Development Corporation for Women`s Award for Empowerment of Rural Women in Maharashtra.
 Banking Frontier`s National Level Awards (3 Categories)
 Excellency in Network Banking,
 NPA Management 
 Statutory Compliance

Study Tour
1994-Agricultural study tour on Water Management to Israel.
Countries travelled- Germany, France, Italy, Austria, Switzerland and Netherlands.

References

External links
Directors of Shri Dnyaneshwar Sahakari Sakhar Karkhana Ltd
Empowering India affidavit details of Abhang Pandurang Gamaji 
Management committee of Shri Saibaba Sansthan Trust, Shirdi 
Sitting and previous MLAs from Shevgaon Assembly Constituency
State Elections 2004 Sheogaon Assembly Constituency

Living people
Maharashtra MLAs 1995–1999
Maharashtra district councillors
People from Ahmednagar district
Nationalist Congress Party politicians from Maharashtra
Marathi politicians
Year of birth missing (living people)